Aguada Formation may refer to:
 Aguada Limestone, a Miocene geologic formation in Puerto Rico
 Aguada de la Perdiz Formation, an Ordovician geologic formation in Chile
 Aguada Member, a member of the Cenomanian to Coniacian La Luna Formation in Colombia and Venezuela